Cratocryptus is a genus of parasitoid wasps belonging to the family Ichneumonidae.

Species:
 Cratocryptus furcator

References

Ichneumonidae
Ichneumonidae genera